Ronin Challenge is an adventure module published in 1990 for the Advanced Dungeons & Dragons fantasy role-playing game.

Plot summary
Ronin Challenge is a Kara-Tur adventure scenario in which the player characters attend a martial arts tournament before journeying into hazardous wilderness and ancient ruins.

Publication history
OA6 Ronin Challenge was written by Curtis Smith and Rick Swan, with a cover by Jim Holloway, and was published by TSR in 1990 as an 80-page booklet with a large color map and an outer folder.

Reception

Reviews
GamesMaster International (Issue 5 - Dec 1990)

References

Dungeons & Dragons modules
Forgotten Realms adventures
Role-playing game supplements introduced in 1990